The 2003 European Junior Badminton Championships were the 18th tournament of the European Junior Badminton Championships. They were held in Esbjerg, Denmark, from 12–19 April 2003.

Medalists

Results

Semi-finals

Finals

References

External links 
 Badminton Europe: European Junior Championships-Individuals
 Badminton Europe: European Junior Team Championships

European Junior Badminton Championships
European Junior Badminton Championships
European Junior Badminton Championships
European Junior Badminton Championships
International sports competitions hosted by Denmark